The Wörld Is Ours – Vol. 1: Everywhere Further Than Everyplace Else is the eleventh live album by the band Motörhead, released on 22 November 2011. Recorded at the Teatro Caupolicán, Santiago, Chile, the Best Buy Theatre, New York City and at the Manchester Apollo in England. It is the second release with the UDR / Motörhead Music / EMI collaboration of distribution in various territories.

Recording
Filmed and recorded on tour over 2010 and 2011, it is the entire concert of the Teatro Caupolicán, Santiago appearance on 9 April 2011, with parts of the Manchester Apollo concert on 16 November 2010, on the UK leg of the tour, and the special appearance at Best Buy Theatre in New York City on 28 February 2011. It has guest appearances from Doro Pesch, Todd Youth and Michael Monroe. Doro and Todd Youth have been regular guests of Motörhead for some years, joining them live regularly when on tour in Europe especially, having appeared on their last three live albums also. It is the first time the Finnish rocker Michael Monroe has made an appearance with Motörhead live.

Release
The live album is released as both a DVD and a CD; issued as a single Blu-ray DVD or 2 CDs, and also released in a special 2 CD & 1 DVD package, all versions have both 5.1 Surround and 2.0 Stereo available. Recorded on The Wörld is Yours world tour of 2010 and 2011, it made the usual amount of noise the band had at this point in their career, and is part of a two volume release of the tour.

It features a large repertoire of the band's work over the years. The modern regular set opener "We Are Motörhead", which replaced Motörhead the song; "Over the Top",  "The Chase Is Better Than The Catch" and "I Got Mine" from the early eighties; "Just 'Cos You Got The Power" and "Killed by Death" from the late eighties; "Going to Brazil" the only track from the nineties; and various tracks from the albums released since 2000, with the usual set regulars of "Stay Clean", "Metropolis", "Ace of Spades" and "Overkill". The recordings at this stage had improved in sound quality far exceeding previous material, this being the first Surround Sound mix Motörhead have released.

Track listing

DVD

CD 1

CD 2

Personnel
Per The Wörld Is Ours – Vol. 1: Everywhere Further Than Everyplace Else liner notes.
 Lemmy Kilmister – lead vocals, bass
 Phil Campbell – lead guitar, backing vocals
 Mikkey Dee – drums
 Doro – co-vocals on "Killed by Death" in NYC
 Todd Youth – co-lead guitar on "Killed by Death" in NYC
 Michael Monroe – co-vocals on "Born to Raise Hell" in Manchester
 Motörhead – executive producers

References

Motörhead live albums
2011 live albums